The Lauingen Energy Park is a 25.7–megawatt (MW) photovoltaic power station, located in Bavarian Swabia, Germany.

The project was built in three phases:
 The 10.0 MW Helmeringen 1 (already commissioned in 2009)
 The 9.4 MW Helmeringen 2 
 The 6.3 MW Helmeringen 3 (built and commissioned in 2010)

The largest solar power station in Swabia was built by the German company Gehrlicher Solar and features the following key figures:
 288,132 thin-film modules using  cadmium telluride photovoltaics (CdTe PV) manufactured by U.S. company First Solar 
 17,952 conventional solar panels based using crystalline silicon photovoltaics manufactured by Chinese company Yingli
 18 SMA solar inverters
 3 Siemens central inverters
 a total of 664 km solar cable trays
 a projected generation of almost 27 million kilowatt-hours (kWh)
 an avoided 14,353 tons of CO2 per year 
 powers about 7,500 average households with clean energy, where average means a three-person household with an annual electricity consumption of 3,500 kWh.

Gallery

See also 

Photovoltaics
Photovoltaic power station
List of largest power stations in the world
Solar power in Germany

References 

Photovoltaic power stations in Germany